The Obrecheuil is a small river of Belgium, right tributary of the Haine. The spring is in the municipality of Le Rœulx. The river flows through the village of Thieusies, Casteau and St-Denis, to end her trip in the village of Obourg where the river meets the river Haine. Sometimes the river is named Aubrecheuil.

Around the river is a fertile valley known as a centre for growing chicory, hops, and earlier in the 20th century tobacco.

References

Rivers of Belgium
Rivers of Hainaut (province)